The 1943 St. Louis Cardinals season was the team's 62nd season in St. Louis, Missouri and the 52nd season in the National League. The Cardinals went 105–49 during the season and finished 1st in the National League. In the World Series, they met the New York Yankees. They lost the series in 5 games.

Offseason
 November 7, 1942: Hal Epps was drafted from the Cardinals by the St. Louis Browns in the 1942 minor league draft.
 November 24, 1942: Gerry Staley was drafted by the Cardinals from the Boise Pilots in the 1942 minor league draft.

Regular season
Outfielder Stan Musial won the MVP Award this year, batting .357, with 13 home runs and 81 RBIs. This was the second consecutive year a Cardinal won the MVP award, with Mort Cooper having won the award the previous season.

Season standings

Record vs. opponents

Roster

Player stats

Batting

Starters by position
Note: Pos = Position; G = Games played; AB = At bats; H = Hits; Avg. = Batting average; HR = Home runs; RBI = Runs batted in

Other batters
Note: G = Games played; AB = At bats; H = Hits; Avg. = Batting average; HR = Home runs; RBI = Runs batted in

Pitching

Starting pitchers
Note: G = Games pitched; IP = Innings pitched; W = Wins; L = Losses; ERA = Earned run average; SO = Strikeouts

Other pitchers
Note: G = Games pitched; IP = Innings pitched; W = Wins; L = Losses; ERA = Earned run average; SO = Strikeouts

Relief pitchers
Note: G = Games pitched; W = Wins; L = Losses; SV = Saves; ERA = Earned run average; SO = Strikeouts

1943 World Series 

AL New York Yankees (4) vs. NL St. Louis Cardinals (1)

Awards and records
Stan Musial, National League leader, Triples, (20).

Farm system

LEAGUE CHAMPIONS: Columbus

References

External links
1943 St. Louis Cardinals at Baseball Reference
1943 St. Louis Cardinals team page at www.baseball-almanac.com

St. Louis Cardinals seasons
Saint Louis Cardinals season
National League champion seasons
St Louis Cardinals